Véronique Robert (1962 – 24 June 2017) was a Franco-Swiss journalist and war correspondent, who died in a Paris hospital on 24 June 2017, at age 54, after being wounded in an explosion in Mosul, Iraq, five days earlier, on 19 June.

Robert was wounded in the same mine explosion that killed Iraqi journalist Bakhtiyar Haddad and fellow French journalist Stéphan Villeneuve, and wounded Samuel Foley, who works for Le Figaro. Robert and Villeneuve were working for France Télévisions on a report for the French TV documentary show Envoyé spécial.

On 29 June 2017, it was announced that she would be made a Chevalier of the Legion of Honour.

In 2007, one of her sons was raped in Dubai, prompting her to launch a campaign against the authorities.

References

1962 births
2017 deaths
French war correspondents
Swiss journalists
People from Morges
Journalists killed while covering the Arab Spring
Chevaliers of the Légion d'honneur